Hermien Peters (born 19 November 1994), also known as Hermione Peters, is a Belgian sprint canoeist who competes in international elite events. She is a Youth Olympic bronze medalist, three time World silver medalist.

Personal life
She is the older sister of Artuur Peters who competed at the 2016 Summer Olympics.

Career
She qualified in the women's K-2 500 metres, and women's K-1 500 metres events at the 2020 Summer Olympics.

References

External links
 

1994 births
Living people
Sportspeople from Limburg (Belgium)
Belgian female canoeists
Olympic canoeists of Belgium
Canoeists at the 2010 Summer Youth Olympics
Canoeists at the 2020 Summer Olympics
ICF Canoe Sprint World Championships medalists in kayak
21st-century Belgian women